Mike Elliott (sometimes credited as Michael Elliott) is a Seattle-based board game, card game and mobile game designer whose titles include Magic: The Gathering, Thunderstone, and Battle Spirits Trading Card Game. Magic head designer Mark Rosewater called him "one of the most prolific Magic designers in the history of the game." He was inducted into the Academy of Adventure Gaming Arts & Design Hall of Fame at the 2017 Origins Game Fair.

Career
While living in Phoenix, Arizona in the early 1990s, Elliott and several of his friends were active bridge players and competed regularly in tournaments. One evening after a tournament, a friend introduced the group to the Magic: The Gathering trading card game. When Elliott returned home he purchased the game and began playing in Magic tournaments. While at a Magic tournament at Arizona State University Elliott told two fellow attendees what he thought was wrong with the game. During the conversation they revealed that they worked for Wizards of the Coast. One of them, Joel Mick, invited Elliott to fly to Seattle and interview for a position with the company.

Wizards of the Coast
Elliott started at Wizards of the Coast in January 1996 as a developer. Afterward he was promoted to designer, and then senior designer. He worked on approximately 30 Magic expansions and introduced new mechanics such as slivers. His Magic related expansions and project included:

Designing
 Portal
 Weatherlight
 Tempest (the card Emmessi Tome was named in his honor; M.S.E. - Michael Scott Elliott).
 Stronghold (lead)
 Portal Second Age
 Exodus (lead)
 Urza's Saga (lead)
 Urza's Legacy (lead)
 Unglued
 Mercadian Masques (lead)
 Nemesis (lead)
 Fifth Edition (lead)
 Invasion
 Vanguard I (lead)
 Vanguard II (lead)
 Planeshift (lead)
 Torment
 Judgement
 Onslaught (lead)
 Legions (lead)
 Scourge
 Mirrodin
 Champions of Kamigawa
 Betrayers of Kamigawa (lead)
 Ravnica: City of Guilds
 Guildpact (lead)

Developing
 Mirage
 Visions
 Portal
 Weatherlight (lead)
 Tempest
 Stronghold (lead)
 Portal Second Age
 Exodus
 Urza's Saga (lead)
 Urza's Legacy
 Urza's Destiny (lead)
 Mercadian Masques
 Nemesis
 Fifth Edition (lead)
 Prophecy
 Apocalypse (lead)
 Odyssey
 Judgement
 Scourge
 Fifth Dawn
 Champions of Kamigawa

While at Wizards of the Coast he also designed non-Magic games including Harry Potter Trading Card Game, Neopets Trading Card Game, Hecatomb, and Duel Masters Trading Card Game. Elliott left Wizards of the Coast at the end of 2005.

WizKids
After leaving Wizards of the Coast, Elliott worked for WizKids until the company closed its Seattle office.  His titles for WizKids included Star Wars PocketModel Trading Card Game, Halo ActionClix, and DC HeroClix: Batman (Alpha).

Freelance career
As a freelance game designer and developer, Mike Elliott, has designed dozens of games. Notable titles include Battle Spirits Trading Card Game, Thunderstone, Quarriors! and Star Trek: Fleet Captains He also designed Card-Jitsu, an online mini-game in the Club Penguin children's MMO and worked on Hearthstone in early 2017.

Battle Spirits
In 2008 Elliott designed the Battle Spirits Trading Card Game for Bandai. Part of the Battle Spirits franchise—which also includes several anime series, manga serializations and other merchandise such as toys and video games—the TCG was released in Japan in September 2008. Battle Spirits became one of the top selling trading card games of the year.

The game's popularity led to Elliott's appearance in promotional videos, and a new character based on him being added to the anime series Battle Spirits: Shōnen Toppa Bashin. The "Michael Elliott" character was an eccentric American game designer who created the titular Battle Spirits card game played in the series.

Battle Spirits Trading Card Game was released in the United States by Bandai of America on August 14, 2009.

Thunderstone
In 2009 Elliott designed Thunderstone card game for Alderac Entertainment Group. The game won several awards and nominations, including 2010 Golden Geek Best Card Game Nominee, 2010 Japan Boardgame Prize Voters' Selection Nominee, 2010 JoTa Best Card Game Audience Award, 2010 JoTa Best Card Game Critic Award and 2011 Fairplay À la carte Winner. Alderac relaunched Thunderstone in 2017 as Thunderstone Quest with a Kickstarter that raised more than $500,000.

Quarriors! and Dice Masters
In 2012 Elliott designed the Quarriors! dice building game. Published by WizKids, the game won the 2013 Origins Awards for Best Family, Party or Children's Game.

The Quarriors! Dice Masters system expanded to include The Lord of the Rings Dice Building Game, Marvel Dice Masters, DC Comics Dice Masters, Dungeons & Dragons Dice Masters, Yu-Gi-Oh! Dice Masters, and Teenage Mutant Ninja Turtles Dice Masters. WizKids reported that Marvel Dice Masters: Avengers vs. X-Men sold out within its first week of release and in 2015, Marvel Dice Masters won the Origins Vanguard Award.

Shadowrun: Crossfire and Dragonfire
Eliott helped design Shadowrun: Crossfire, The Adventure Deck-building Game for Fire Opal Media and Catalyst Game Labs. Released in August 2014, the game is a cooperative card game that combines elements of roleplaying games and deck-building card games. Dragonfire, a cooperative deck-builder game based on the Dungeons & Dragons roleplaying game and using the Crossfire game engine, was launched in 2017.

Credits

Magic: The Gathering
 Lead Designer Magic Guildpact Expansion
 Lead Designer Magic Betrayers of Kamigawa Expansion
 Lead Designer Magic Legions Expansion
 Lead Designer Magic Onslaught Expansion
 Lead Designer Magic Planeshift Expansion
 Lead Designer Magic Nemesis Expansion
 Lead Designer Magic Mercadian Masques Expansion
 Lead Designer Magic Urza’s Legacy Expansion
 Lead Designer Magic Urza’s Saga Expansion
 Lead Designer Magic Exodus Expansion
 Lead Designer Magic Stronghold Expansion
 Designer Magic Ravnica Expansion
 Designer Magic Champions of Kamigawa Expansion
 Designer Magic Mirrodin Expansion
 Designer Magic Judgment Expansion
 Designer Magic Torment Expansion
 Designer Magic Invasion Expansion
 Designer Magic Tempest Expansion
 Designer Magic Weatherlight Expansion
 Lead Designer/Developer Magic 5th Edition Expansion
 Lead Developer Apocalypse Magic Expansion
 Lead Developer Nemesis Magic Expansion
 Lead Developer Urza’s Destiny Magic Expansion
 Lead Developer Urza’s Saga Magic Expansion
 Lead Developer Stronghold Magic Expansion
 Lead Developer Weatherlight Magic Expansion
 Developer Fifth Dawn Magic Expansion
 Developer Scourge Magic Expansion
 Developer Judgment Magic Expansion
 Developer Odyssey Magic Expansion
 Developer Exodus Magic Expansion
 Developer Prophecy Magic Expansion
 Lead Designer Vanguard Magic game play accessory

Computer games
 Research and Development lead Magic Interactive Computer Encyclopedia
 Research and Development lead Microprose Magic Computer Game
 Designer Cardjitsu Trading Card Game for Club Penguin Website

Original game design credits

Trading card games
 Battle Spirits Trading Card Game 2008
 Duelmasters Trading Card Game 2002
 Neopets Trading Card game 2003 – 2006
 Harry Potter Trading Card game 1999-2001
 Xiaolin Showdown Trading Card game 2005 - 2006
 Hecatomb Trading Card game 2005 – 2006
 Simpsons Trading Card game 2002
 Charm Angel Trading Card Game (Japan) – 2006- 2007
 UzuMajin Trading Card Game (Japan) 2007- 2008
 Cardjitsu/Disney Club Penguin Trading Card Game 2008–present
 Topps Attax Baseball Trading Card Game 2009
 Puck Attax Hockey Trading Card Game 2010
 Star Wars Force Attax Trading Card Game 2012
 Yo-kai Watch Trading Card Game 2016
 Dragoborne: Rise to Supremacy 2017

Single deck card games
 Earthquake Card game 1997
 Instinct Card game 1997
 Agent Hunter Card game 2013
 Final Touch 2016
 The Dingo Ate The Baby 2017

Miniatures games
 Dreamblade Anvilborn expansion 2006
 Axis and Allies Naval Miniatures 2006- 2011
 Star Wars Pocketmodel Trading Card Game 2007-2008
 Halo Actionclix Miniatures Game 2007-2008
 Mechwarrior Solaris VII Miniatures 2007-2008
 Heroclix Alpha Miniatures Game 2008

Board games
 Sword and Skull 2005
 Thunderstone/Thunderstone Advance 2009–2014  Base game and expansions
 Star Trek Fleet Captains 2011–2014  Base game and expansions
 Quarriors Dice Building Game 2011–2014 Base game and expansions
 Lost Legends 2013
 Sangoku 2013
 Shadowrun: Crossfire 2013
 Lord of the Rings Dice Building Game 2012
 Marvel Dice Masters 2013
 Yu-Gi-Oh! Dice Masters 2014
 DC Comics Dice Masters 2015
 Dungeons & Dragons Dice Masters 2015
 Teenage Mutant Ninja Turtles Dice Masters 2016
 Speechless 2016
 Dragonfire 2017
 Shutterbug 2017
 Immortals 2017
 Thunderstone Quest 2018

iOS and digital games
 Thunderstone 2011
 Connect with Pieces: Pacific Rim 2013
 Quarriors 2013
 Letter Pix 2014

Other brands
 Wizards of the Coast R&D lead Pokémon TCG 1999-2001
 Lead Developer X-Men Trading Card Game
 Lead Developer Star Wars Trading Card Game
 Designer WOTC Star Wars TCG /Set design on 5 expansions
 Designer Netrunner Classic expansion
 Lead Designer Heritage WWE Flip and Fight Card Game System
 Connect With Pieces 2012

References

Living people
Board game designers
American game designers
Year of birth missing (living people)